Hassan Dhuhul (died 23 March 2022) was a Somali politician and former MP who was killed in the March 2022 Somalia attacks.

See also 

 Amina Mohamed Abdi

References 

20th-century births
2022 deaths
Members of the Federal Parliament of Somalia
21st-century Somalian politicians
Terrorism victims
Deaths by car bomb in Somalia
Assassinated Somalian politicians